Miss America 1952, the 25th Miss America pageant, was held at the Boardwalk Hall in Atlantic City, New Jersey on September 8, 1951. At age 25 (the maximum age that an entrant may be), Colleen Kay Hutchins is the second-oldest contestant to capture the crown (Debra Sue Maffett, Miss America 1983, is the oldest by a few months).

The first Miss Utah to win the crown, Hutchins, who died in 2010, was the mother of pro basketball player and executive Kiki Vandeweghe and grandmother of tennis player Coco Vandeweghe.

Results

Awards

Preliminary awards

Other awards

Contestants

References

Secondary sources

External links
 Miss America official website

1952
1951 beauty pageants
1951 in New Jersey
September 1951 events in the United States
Events in Atlantic City, New Jersey